Fátima Leyva Morán (born 14 February 1980) is a Mexican retired footballer who played for the Mexico women's national football team. She played as a midfielder for the Michigan Chill SC of the WPSL .

Playing career
During her international career, Leyva participated at numerous tournaments, namely the CONCACAF (1998), Nike Cup (1998, 2000), World Cup (1999), Pan American Games (1999, 2003) and Copa de Oro (2000) tournaments.

Leyva was the captain of FC Indiana in the W-League. In 2010, she signed for Russian champion Zvezda Perm, where she reunited her former coach Shek Borkowski. During her career with Zvezda Perm, Leyva and her team became runners-up in Russia's professional league. That same season, Zvezda Perm became quarter finalist in the UEFA Champions League.

Leyva's extraordinary season with Zvezda Perm, drove Russian team FC Zorky Krasnogorsk to sign Leyva for their 2012–2013 season. During that season, FC Zorky becomes Russian League Champions and UEFA Champions League finalist.

In May 2016, Leyva signed with Michigan Chill SC and was named the team captain.

Broadcasting career
After the Mexico national team failed to qualify for the 2003 women's World Cup, she was hired by Univision as a color commentator for its Cup transmissions.

References

External links
 

1980 births
Living people
Mexican women's footballers
Mexico women's international footballers
1999 FIFA Women's World Cup players
Footballers at the 2004 Summer Olympics
Olympic footballers of Mexico
Footballers from Mexico City
Mexican expatriate women's footballers
Expatriate women's soccer players in the United States
Expatriate women's footballers in Russia
Mexican expatriates in Russia
Women's association football midfielders
Pan American Games bronze medalists for Mexico
Pan American Games medalists in football
FC Zorky Krasnogorsk (women) players
Zvezda 2005 Perm players
F.C. Indiana players
Footballers at the 2003 Pan American Games
Footballers at the 1999 Pan American Games
Medalists at the 1999 Pan American Games
Medalists at the 2003 Pan American Games
21st-century Mexican women
20th-century Mexican women
Mexican footballers